Got It or I Got it or variants may refer to:

Music
Got It?, Korean-language EP by boy band Got7 2014
"Got it", song by The Screaming Jets from All for One
"I Got It", a song by Donnie Wahlberg featuring Aubrey O'Day
"I Got It", song by Gorilla Zoe from Don't Feed da Animals, redirect I Got It (Gorilla Zoe song)
"I Got It", song by Ashanti from Braveheart, redirect I Got It (Ashanti song)
"I Got Id", a song by the American rock band Pearl Jam featuring Neil Young
"I've Got It", song by Ledisi from Feeling Orange but Sometimes Blue 2003
"I've Got It", song by Jack Teagarden and David Rose
"He Got It", song by Allie Baby from Drumma Boy production discography 
"He's Got It", song by Dean Fraser	 
"She Got It", song by 2 Pistols from his debut album Death Before Dishonor 2008
"She's Got It", song by Little Richard 1956
"We Got It", song from the musical Over Here! 1974
"We've Got It", song by Cults from Static
"You Got It", song by Roy Orbison 1989

Other
She's Got It (Hebrew Ein La Elohim) 2007 Israeli comedy film with Dorit Bar-Or

See also
You've Got It (disambiguation)